Johan Julius Ferdinand Kronberg (11 December 1850 – 17 October 1921) was a Swedish artist and decorative painter.

Biography 
Kronberg was born in Karlskrona, Sweden, in 1850. At the age of thirteen, he was admitted to the Royal Swedish Academy of Fine Arts. In 1870, he was awarded a gold medal for his portrayal of Gustav Vasa receiving a new translation of the Bible (used on a postage stamp in 1941). He studied with Johan Christoffer Boklund, a history painter who had a major influence on his style and, for a short time, Johan Fredrik Höckert. A travel scholarship in 1873 enabled him to visit Copenhagen, Düsseldorf and Paris. 

After a short stay in Venice, he spent considerable time in Munich. It was there that he became interested in decorative painting and was exposed to the work of Hans Makart, which left a strong impression on him. In 1876 his painting, "Nymph and Faun" was praised by August Strindberg and led to his becoming an "agré" (a type of member candidate) at the Royal Academy.

He settled in Rome in 1877 and lightened his palette, somewhat after the style of Giovanni Battista Tiepolo. Upon returning to Stockholm in 1889, he set up a studio in Norra Djurgården and specialized in architectural painting. His motifs were usually taken from mythology or the Bible, as well as works by Shakespeare.

Among his best known works are three ceiling paintings in the west staircase of Stockholm Palace, a portrayal of Jesus' life in the dome of Adolf Fredrik Church and a proscenium depicting Eros at the Royal Dramatic Theatre.

He made a final study trip in 1894, to Würzburg, Madrid and Venice, where he focused on Tiepolo's ceiling paintings. The following year, he accepted a professorship at the Royal Academy but, much to the disappointment of his students, resigned in 1898.

In 1885, he had refused to sign a petition criticizing the teaching methods at the Royal Academy and his relationship with the Konstnärsförbundet (Artists' Association) cooled considerably. By 1900, their conflicting views had reached the point where he began to withdraw from public life. He became isolated and his works grew repetitious. Later, he developed an interest in theology. During his final years, he suffered from cancer.

After his death in Stockholm in 1921, his studio was bequeathed to the Nordic Museum and, at the expense of Wilhelmina von Hallwyl, was moved and reassembled at Skansen, an open-air museum and zoo. It served as the setting for the cover photograph of the pop group ABBA's 1981 album, The Visitors.

His works may be seen at the Gothenburg Museum of Art, Skansen and the Hallwyl Museum.

Selected works

References

Further reading
Asplund, Karl: Julius Kronbergs atelier: kortfattad vägledning, beskrivande katalog över konstnärens efterlämnade arbeten samt en inledande essay om Kronbergs konst, Norstedt (1922) 
Görts, Maria: Julius Kronberg: hans konst och konstnärskap 1875-1889, Stockholm University (1985)
Julius Kronberg: monumentala sötsaker i grevinnans smak, Hallwyliana Series, 0282-0471 (2004)

External links 

 Biography @ the Svenskt Biografiskt Lexikon
 "Julius Kronberg : 70 reproduktioner i tontryck efter fotografier af originalen" @ the Internet Archive
 More works by Kronberg @ ArtNet
 Biography from the Svea Folkkalender @ Project Runeberg
 Julius Kronbergs Studio at Skansen

19th-century Swedish painters
Swedish male painters
20th-century Swedish painters
1850 births
1921 deaths
19th-century Swedish male artists
20th-century Swedish male artists